Annie Dorothy Betts (1884 – 8 September 1961) was a British apiculturist, bee disease expert, author and editor. She made scientifically significant observations on honeybees, wrote books on apiculture, and edited the journal Bee World.

Life 
Betts was first published in 1912 when she wrote an article on the fungi Pericytis alvei. She was the first to describe that species. In 1972 P. alvei was given a new combination and included in the newly described genus Bettsia. This genus was named in her honour.

During the First World War Betts worked as an aeronautical engineer.

She was a member of the Apis Club and was the editor of its journal Bee World from 1929 to 1949. Betts was also a prolific contributor to that journal and published over 170 articles on various subjects relating to honeybees within its pages. After ensuring the continued success of Bee World during two world wars, Betts retired as editor in 1949. She left the journal in a sound financial position. Betts died in 1961.

Selected works
 The fungi of the beehive. (1912) Journal of Economic Biology 7, pp. 129–162
 Practical Bee Anatomy. (1923) The Apis Club, Benson 
 The Constancy of the Pollen-collecting Bee. (1920) Bee World, 2(1–4), pp. 10–11

References

1884 births
1961 deaths
20th-century British women scientists
20th-century British scientists
British beekeepers
Aeronautical engineers
British science writers
20th-century British women writers
Women beekeepers